The Naval Museum of Armament & Technology (NMAT) preserves and interprets the history of Naval Air Weapons Station China Lake and its heritage of advancing Naval aviation armament and technology. This museum is the repository of artifacts, photographs and film, documents and related heritage memorabilia from China Lake. The museum is dedicated to those who have employed their talents in advancing Naval aviation research, development, testing and evaluation, as well as the history of the Secret City (China Lake).

History
The China Lake Museum Foundation, a 501(c)(3) organization, directly supports the museum in preserving and displaying the legacy of technology and weaponry for naval aviation. Through displays and education, the museum explains to the public the heritage of the Navy's achievements in air warfare and other areas, with a special focus on China Lake and its military-civilian-industry teamwork. Pieces in the museum collection date back to 1955.

Relocation
The museum was relocated from the naval base to the adjoining city of Ridgecrest. This will make it easier for the public to access the museum. All displays and aircraft will be progressively moved from the base museum to the new location.

Collections
 AIM-9 Sidewinder
 BGM-109 Tomahawk
 AIM-54 Phoenix
 APAM CBU-59
 ASM-2 Bat
 AGM-83 Bulldog
 AGM-53 Condor
 Fuel Air Explosive Weapons
 CBU-78/B GATOR
 AGM-88 HARM
 AGM-154 Joint Standoff Weapon
 LGB-24B/B Laser-guided bomb
 Mark 80 Series General-Purpose Bombs
 AGM-65 Maverick
 AGM-136 Tacit Rainbow
 Mark 20 Rockeye II
 AGM-45 Shrike anti-radiation missile
 AGM-122 Sidearm
 SLAM-ER
 AGM-62 Walleye

Aircraft On Display
 Grumman F11F-1F Super Tiger
 F/A-18A Hornet

See also
List of maritime museums in the United States

References

Other Navy museums
See: U.S. Navy Museum and U.S. Navy Museum#Other Navy museums

External links
 Naval Museum of Armament and Technology 
 China Lake Museum Foundation

Museums in Kern County, California
United States naval aviation
Naval museums in the United States
Aerospace museums in California
Military and war museums in California
2008 establishments in California
Museums established in 2008